The following is an incomplete list of South African politicians, both past and present.

A 
 Prince Arthur of Connaught (1883–1938); Governor-General 1920–23
 Ken Andrew (born 1943), chairman of Democratic Party 1991–94
 Kader Asmal (1934–2011), Minister of Education 1999–2004

B 
 Glenn Babb (born 1943), Ambassador to Canada (1985–87), and to Italy; Nationalist Party Member of Parliament
 Sibusiso Bengu (born 1934) Minister of Education (1994–99)
 Goodwill Zwelethini kaBhekuzulu, (1948–2021) traditional King of Zulu nation 1971–2021
 Louis Botha (1862–1919), Prime Minister of South Africa, 1910–1919
 P.W. Botha (1916–2006), Prime Minister of South Africa (1978–84); State President (1984–89)
 Thozamile Botha (born 1948), ANC activist
 Mangosuthu Buthelezi (born 1928); Inkosi of the Buthelezi tribe, 1953–present; Chief Minister of KwaZulu "Homeland" (1976–94)
 Sydney Buxton, 1st Earl Buxton (1853–1934); Governor-General 1914–1920
 Steve Biko (1946–1977); Black Consciousness leader;
 Schalk Willem Burger (1852–1918); President of the South African Republic, (Transvaal), 1900–1902

C 
 The 1st Earl of Athlone (1874–1957); Governor-General 1924–30;
 Arthur Chaskalson (1931–2012); Chief Justice of South Africa, 2001–2005
 Jeremy Cronin (born 1949); Communist SACP activist

D 

 Zach de Beer (1928–1999), last leader of Progressive Federal Party, co-founder of Democratic Party
 F.W. de Klerk (1936–2021); last State President, 1989–94; succeeded by Nelson Mandela
 Patricia de Lille (born 1951); founder, in 2003, of Independent Democrats 
 Nicolaas Jacobus de Wet (1873–1960); Governor-General 1943–46
 Nicolaas Johannes Diederichs (1903–1978); State President 1975–78
 Nkosazana Dlamini-Zuma (born 1949); Foreign Minister 1999–2009
 Patrick Duncan (1870–1943); Governor-General 1937–43;

E 

Abba Eban (1915–2002), Israeli diplomat and politician; VP of the United Nations General Assembly, and Foreign Minister of Israel
 Colin Eglin (1925–2013), leader of Progressive Party 1971–1977, Progressive Reform Party 1975–1977, and Progressive Federal Party 1977–1979 & 1986–1988

F 
 Jacobus Johannes Fouché (1898–1980); State President 1968–75

G 
 The 1st Viscount Gladstone (1854–1930); Governor-General 1910–14
 John Gunda; MP implicated in abuse of travel vouchers

H 

 Chris Hani (1942–1993), leader of South African Communist Party from 1991 until his assassination in 1993
 J. B. M. Hertzog (1866–1942); Prime Minister of South Africa 1924–39

J 
 Ernest George Jansen (1881–1959); Governor-General 1950–59;
 Danny Jordaan (born 1951), MP 1994–97, more famous for bringing 2010 World Cup to South Africa.

K 
 Paul Kruger (1825–1904); "Oom Paul", President of the South African Republic (Transvaal), 1883–1900 
 Piet Koornhof (1925–2007), apartheid-era cabinet minister and ambassador, later a member of the African National Congress

L 
 Harry Lawrence (1901–1973): United Party Minister 1939–1948 and first Progressive Party chairman from 1959
 Tony Leon (born 1956); Leader of the Opposition, 1999–2007
 Albert Luthuli (1898–1967), President of the African National Congress, 1952–67

M

Daniel François Malan (1874–1959); Prime Minister of South Africa 1948–54  
General Magnus Malan (1930–2011), Chief of South African Defence Force 1976–80; Minister of Defence, 1980–91;
Wynand Malan (born 1943); co-founder of Independent Party and Democratic Party
Nelson Mandela (1918–2013); leader of Umkhonto we Sizwe 1961–90; President of South Africa 1994–99
Trevor Manuel (born 1956); Minister of Finance, 1996–2009;
Isaac Lesiba Maphotho (1931–2019) South African anti-apartheid activist and Umkhonto we Sizwe (MK) veteran
Govan Mbeki (1910–2001) South African activist and father of Thabo Mbeki
Thabo Mbeki (born 1942); President of South Africa 1999–2008;
Frank Mdlalose (1931–2021); Premier of KwaZulu-Natal Province, 1994–97
Raymond Mhlaba (1920–2005) South African activist and Premier of the Eastern Cape 1994–1997
Donald Barkly Molteno (1908–1972); anti-apartheid M.P.
James Molteno (1865–1936); First Speaker of the South African Parliament 1910–15
Sir John Molteno (1814–1886); First Prime Minister of the Cape Colony 1872–78
Julius Sello Malema (born 1981); former ANCYL president and Currently, – president of the Economic Freedom  Fighter (EFF), most notable politician in South Africa.

N 
 Tom Naudé (1889–1969); Acting State President, 1967–68
 Bulelani Ngcuka (born 1954); National Director of Public Prosecutions 1998–2004

O 
 Dullah Omar (1934–2004); Minister of Justice, 1994–99; Minister of Transport 1999–2004

P 
 Marthinus Wessel Pretorius (1819–1901); First President of the South African Republic (1857–63)

R 
 Cyril Ramaphosa (born 1952); Secretary General of African National Congress 1991–94; Chairman of Constitutional Assembly 1994–97
 Deneys Reitz (1882–1944); Boer Commando, soldier (World War I), Cabinet Minister, Deputy Prime Minister (1939–1943), High Commissioner to London (1944)
 Cecil John Rhodes (5 July 1853 – 26 March 1902); Prime Minister of the Cape Colony (1890 - 1896)

S
Harry Schwarz (1924–2010); Leader of Reform Party, leading anti-apartheid M.P. and Ambassador to United States 1991–94
Mosima "Tokyo" Sexwale (born 5 March 1953); Premier of Gauteng province, 1994–98
Field Marshal Jan Smuts (1870–1950); Prime Minister, 1919–24 and 1939–48
Joe Slovo (1926–95); General Secretary of SACP 1984–91
Saul Solomon (1817–1892); Prominent liberal member of the Cape Parliament 1854–83
Jan Steytler (1910 – after 1977); leader of Progressive Party 1959–70 
Lucas Cornelius Steyn (1903–1976); Chief Justice 1959–76; Acting Governor-General 1959, 1961 
Johannes Gerhardus Strijdom (1893–1958); Prime Minister 1954–58
Helen Suzman (1917–2009); anti-apartheid M.P. 1952–1981
Charles Robberts Swart (1894–1982); Governor-General 1960–61; first State President 1961–67  
Mbhazima Shilowa (born 1958); Premier of Gauteng Province, 1999–2008

V 
 Jan van Riebeeck (1619–1677); first Dutch administrator of Cape Town settlement, 1652–62
 Frederik van Zyl Slabbert (born 1940); Leader of the Opposition as chairman of the Progressive Federal Party, 1979–86.
 Gideon Brand van Zyl (1873–1956); Governor-General, 1945–50
H.F. Verwoerd (1901–1966); nicknamed "The Architect of Apartheid"; Prime Minister, 1958–66, until his assassination.
 The 6th Earl of Clarendon (1877–1955); Governor-General, 1931–37; 
 Marais Viljoen (1915–2007); State President, 1979–84
 B.J. Vorster (1915–1983); Prime Minister, 1966–78; State President, 1978–79

Z 
 Jacob Zuma (born 1942); former President of South Africa 2007–2018
 Zille, Helen (born 1951); Mayor of Cape Town, 2006–2009; Premier of Western Cape province, 2009–present)

See also
 List of South Africans
 President of South Africa

 
Politicians